All of You is the third studio album by American singer-songwriter Colbie Caillat. The album was scheduled to be released on May 3, 2011, but was pushed back by two months to a July 6, 2011, release in the United States through Universal Republic Records. The set, largely produced by Greg Wells, features one guest appearance by rapper/actor Common, who graces "Favorite Song", while her songwriting collaborators include Ryan Tedder, Toby Gad, Jason Reeves and Rick Nowels. The album's lead-single "I Do" was released on February 7, 2011, and has charted at number 23 on the US Billboard Hot 100 chart and at number 11 on the Adult Pop Songs. A second single "Brighter Than the Sun" was released on May 17, 2011, and has charted at number 47 on the Billboard Hot 100 chart.

Background
"I still incorporate all the styles that I love that were on Breakthrough and Coco, but it's a new chapter," she said in a Billboard interview. "I've experienced more and I've written with new songwriters who are really talented, but it's still my same music and feel and sound. The songs are more up-tempo on this record, and it's like a full-on summer album."
Caillat began recording All of You in 2010, in California and finished up the album between tour dates 2010 fall. The first single, "I Do", debuted at number twenty-three on the Billboard Hot 100 in February and has since sold 154,000 copies, according to Nielsen SoundScan. Meanwhile, Caillat is excited to unveil the new track "Favorite Song", a guitar-driven pop collaboration with Common in which Caillat croons between the rapper's slick verses. "I've loved Common's music for years," Caillat says of the unlikely pairing, which was put into motion when the two artists met each other at an event for the Grammys in 2009. "He ended up singing his song 'The Light,' and he needed a girl singer [for the chorus] and I was like, 'I know it!' Afterward he was like, "I love your song and I love your voice.' It took about a year for us to get something together, but it worked out better than we could have imagined." Bill Lamb wrote for About.com positively that the song "is bright, summery, and it is utterly charming". Caillat penned two album tracks with pop songwriter Ryan Tedder (Kelly Clarkson, Beyoncé, Leona Lewis), while Toby Gad, Jason Reeves and Rick Nowels all have writing credits on "All of You." Meanwhile, Caillat's boyfriend, musician Justin Young, wrote three songs on the album with the singer, an experience she calls "so much fun. I've never been interested in musicians before, and now having a boyfriend that plays amazing guitar and piano and has a beautiful voice… it's cheesy but it's awesome, because we write these songs about our relationship and it brought us closer together." Guitarist David Becker appears on five songs.

Music and songs
The first single "I Do" jumps headfirst into the vivacious happiness of falling in love. Her inspiration for this track came from finding that person who makes you feel like you're ready for that next big step, marriage, and being unafraid to take that step. The percussion helps set the mood with a sidewalk-skipping beat. Colbie's lyrics are complemented with light guitar and playful piano. The opening track, "Brighter Than the Sun", also stands out as effervescent, with upbeat guitar and claps for percussion. The lyrics reflect the tumble into love: "Boy, we go together like peanuts and Paydays/ Marley and Reggae/ And everybody needs to get a chance to say/ Oh, this is how it starts/ Lightning strikes the heart/ It goes off like a gun/ Brighter than the sun.' "Dream Life, Life" takes a look into the hopes and dreams we have for our lives—and wanting to make them the reality. In the song, Colbie remains realistic about her wishes, and lets us know: "There's no more wasting time on what I think I'm supposed to do/ My clock is standing still so I can have my dream life/ Life with the ones I love playin' all day long/ Laying back by the water side with nowhere to go and the music on/ I'm working hard for my dream life to be my real life, and that can't be wrong/ All I have is this life, so I'm makin' it what I want!".

"What If" is a track featured in the movie Letters to Juliet and a duet with Common entitled "Favorite Song", both stray from Caillat's usual sound; the former replaces acoustic guitar with electric and the latter is a hip-hop jam. The title track, "All Of You", preaches accepting everything about your lover—the good, the bad, the deep secrets. It features a mellow guitar line and lyrics that begin almost like an apology. "What Means The Most" comes up as the most mellow musically. Many of the little things that make being in love so pleasant are mentioned within this track, a memoir of the little moments that brighten up each day and the peace of mind that comes just from being with a loved one.

Critical reception

At Metacritic, which assigns a normalized rating out of 100 to reviews from mainstream critics, the album received an average score of 72, based on 6 reviews, which indicates "generally favorable reviews". Kyle Anderson from Entertainment Weekly was positive, saying that "All of You, proves there's more to her than a smile and a hair toss." Anderson went to say that "Caillat plays with rhythmic touches (the high-spirited handclaps on "Brighter Than the Sun") and adds a dollop of country heartbreak to both her voice and her lyrics. On the ruminative title track, for example, world-weary pathos practically drips off the line 'I'm no good at guessing.' Nothing here is a call to arms, but Caillat's soft revolution is rousing nonetheless." Gary Graff from Billboard was also positive, saying that "on 'All of You' she does so with a little more wisdom, balance and musical maturity. Sure, there are still pie-eyed moments ('We go together like peanuts and paydays, Marley and reggae') as Caillat keeps one foot in contemporary Disney Channel and another in vintage Laurel Canyon. Nevertheless, it's hard to not appreciate the smooth craft of the Letters to Juliet film contribution 'What If,' 'Dream Life' and the title track-and the dynamic sophistication of 'Brighter Than the Sun' and 'Favorite Song,' her collaborations with Ryan Tedder and Common, respectively. She also allows for some ambivalence in such tracks as 'Shadow' and 'Before I Let You Go.' But rest assured that in the end, Caillat manages to get her man." Stephen Thomas Erlewine writer of Allmusic gave a favorable review about the album and wrote: "she’s not just strumming, she’s swinging, sometimes urged along by handclaps" but in the end called it "easily her best record yet." Mikael Wood wrote for Los Angeles Times that "All of You puts a significant amount of force into the illusion of effortlessness; its scrim of summer-fun abandon obscures a stage busy with high-level record-making." A very positive review came from Bill Lamb editor of About.com, who rated it four out of five stars and claimed that she has "introduced more variety on her third set All Of You, and it makes the whole album work quite well." Lamb went on to declare that "On All Of You the artistic achievement matches the commercial success."

A more mixed review came from Chris Willman from Chicago Tribune, who declared that "You hate to forever define an artist by her breakout song, but Colbie Caillat's eternal 'Bubbly'-ness doesn't leave much choice other than to worry about how easily the slightest sharp edge might pop the musical air ball in progress." Sputnikmusic called it "her most inconsistent album", saying that "She deserves some credit for trying to shake up a formula that was beginning to get stale, but unfortunately, she falters more often than she succeeds." Mike Driver wrote for BBC Music that "Caillat never truly imposes herself as a solo artist worth investing fully in. She sings prettily enough, but lacks the punch that the very best artists in this very crowded market possess." Jaymie Baxley of Slant Magazine was negative in his review, rating it 1.5 out of 5 stars, saying, "For the most part, All of You is virtually indistinguishable from Caillat's previous work..."

Promotion and singles
The album's lead single, "I Do", was released on February 7, 2011, and was a success, debuting at number 23 on the US Billboard Hot 100. The song gathered positive reviews from music critics. The second single "Brighter Than the Sun" was released on May 17, 2011, and reached number 51 on the Billboard Hot 100 chart. Caillat promoted the album on Today on July 12, 2011, and appeared on The Tonight Show with Jay Leno on July 14, 2011. The song "What If" debuted at number 77 on the Billboard Hot 100, due to strong digital downloads on the week of the album release. Potential singles cited in the future include "Shadow" and "Before I Let You Go". According to her website, fans will choose the next single of the album. The song "Favorite Song" won the poll and was released as the third single on May 8, 2012. It has been played on many American radio stations and has peaked at number 21 on the Hot Adult Pop Songs chart.

Commercial performance
All of You debuted at number six on the US Billboard 200 with first week sales of 70,000 copies. However, it managed to top the Digital Albums Chart. As of June 2014 the album has sold 331,000 copies according to Nielsen SoundScan.

Track listing
The track list was confirmed on the Billboard website, as well as Allmusic.

Charts

Weekly charts

Year-end charts

Release history

References

2011 albums
Albums produced by Greg Wells
Albums produced by Ken Caillat
Albums produced by Rick Nowels
Albums produced by Ryan Tedder
Albums produced by Toby Gad
Colbie Caillat albums
Universal Republic Records albums